Alexandru Radu (born 7 September 1982) is a Romanian former professional footballer who played as a midfielder. In his career Radu, who is nicknamed "The Cat", played almost only for teams from Ilfov County: FC Snagov, Concordia Chiajna, Berceni, SC Popești-Leordeni and Sportul Snagov, the only exception being Viitorul Axintele. In the summer of 2018 Radu announced his retirement, becoming a fitness coach.

Honours

FC Snagov
Liga III: 2005–06, 2007–08

ACS Berceni
Liga III: 2012–13

References

External links
 
 

1982 births
Living people
Footballers from Bucharest
Romanian footballers
Association football midfielders
Liga I players
Liga II players
Liga III players
CS Concordia Chiajna players
CS Sportul Snagov players
AS Voința Snagov players